Brown Town is an unincorporated community in Gaston County, North Carolina, United States.  It is located on the eastern edge of the town of Belmont along the Catawba River.

Fire protection in Brown Town is provided by Community Volunteer Fire Department.

References

Unincorporated communities in North Carolina
Unincorporated communities in Gaston County, North Carolina